The following lists events that happened during 2014 in the Republic of Belarus.

Incumbents
 President: Alexander Lukashenko
 Prime Minister: Mikhail Myasnikovich (until 27 December), Andrei Kobyakov (starting 27 December)

Events

May
 May 29 - The heads of Russia, Kazakhstan, and Belarus sign a treaty forming the Eurasian Economic Union.

August
 August 26 - The President of Russia Vladimir Putin meets with the President of Ukraine Petro Poroshenko in Minsk as disputes in eastern Ukraine continue.

November
 November 10 - Prosecutors in Lithuania charge an employee at the state air navigation company for spying for Belarus over civilian and military air operations.

December
 December 27 - Andrei Kobyakov replaces Mikhail Myasnikovich as Belarus's new prime minister in the biggest government reshuffle since 2010.

References

 
Years of the 21st century in Belarus
2010s in Belarus
Belarus
Belarus